Big Cinemas was an Indian movie theater chain. It was a division of Anil Ambani’s Reliance MediaWorks Ltd (formerly known as Adlabs Films Limited) and a member of Reliance ADA Group.

History 
It was a multiplex theatre chain with over 515 screens in India, US, Malaysia, and the Netherlands. , the company had 280 screens in India. , the company was third-largest cinema chain in Malaysia and featured Hollywood as well as Chinese and Tamil films.
In India Big Cinemas are mostly seen in the state of Maharashtra with its multiplex outlets even in semi-developed cities and small towns. Big Cinemas has its outlets in cities like Mumbai, Pune, Jalandhar, New Delhi, Delhi NCR, Nashik, Nagpur, Indore, Aurangabad, Solapur, Nanded, and Latur.

The most famous Big Cinemas Theatre was Big Cinemas, Wadala (IMAX) in Mumbai which is the world's largest dome shaped Theatre.
 In mid-2009, the company partnered with Pathé Theatres to set up three screens in Netherlands. In 2015 Reliance MediaWorks Ltd sold its 100% stake to Kerala-based Carnival Cinemas for around ₹700 crores. Subsequently, all the Big Cinemas multiplex screens were re-branded as Carnival Cinemas by 2016.

Gallery

See also
CineMAX
PVR Cinemas
INOX Movies
SPI Cinemas

References

External links
Big Cinemas official website
BIG Cinemas enters New Delhi; revamps Odeon theatre
Big Cinemas forays into the Netherlands
Big Cinemas: Scaling up slide advertising

Former cinemas
Cinema chains in India
Reliance Group
Companies based in Mumbai
Entertainment companies established in 2001
2001 establishments in Maharashtra
Indian companies established in 2001
Indian companies disestablished in 2016
Entertainment companies disestablished in 2016